Passiflora alata, the winged-stem passion flower, is a species of flowering plant. It is native to the Amazon, from Peru to eastern Brazil.

Names
The local peoples refer to it as ouvaca, meaning "red star" due to the appearance of its flower. Other names include fragrant grenadilla, and maracuja de refresco. The specific epithet alata means "winged", referring to the 4-winged stems.

Description
It usually blooms around late summer or early fall, needing full sun exposure. P. alata attracts bees, butterflies and birds.

The solitary fruit is highly prized by local people.

Cultivation
In temperate zones P. alata is usually cultivated indoors, though it can also be grown outside in areas where the temperature does not fall below . It has gained the Royal Horticultural Society's Award of Garden Merit.

Medicinal uses
In Brazil, P. alata is officially recognized as a phytomedicine, and was included in first edition of Brazilian Pharmacopoeia in 1929. It is well known in folk medicine throughout South America, though the exact pharmacological composition of the plant is little understood and requires more study.

References

External links
 
 

alata
Flora of Brazil
Flora of South America
Flora of the Amazon